Götzens is a community in the district of Innsbruck-Land in Tyrol and lies on a terrace of the highlands above the capital. The nearest neighbouring villages are Axams and Birgitz in the west, with the towns of Mutters and Natters also nearby. The village was founded in 1869.

Population

References

External links
 Town History (German)

Cities and towns in Innsbruck-Land District